Bryn is a residential and industrial area of Oslo, Norway. The Alna River runs through the neighborhood.

Neighbourhoods of Oslo